The 2003–04 NCAA Division I men's basketball season began on November 10, 2003, progressed through the regular season and conference tournaments, and concluded with the 2004 NCAA Men's Division I Basketball Tournament Championship Game on April 5, 2004, at the Alamodome in San Antonio, Texas. The Connecticut Huskies won their second NCAA national championship with an 82–73 victory over the Georgia Tech Yellow Jackets.

Season headlines 
 The preseason AP All-American team was named on November 12. Emeka Okafor of Connecticut was the leading vote-getter (71 of 72 votes). The rest of the team included Jameer Nelson of Saint Joseph's (49 votes), Rickey Paulding of Missouri (37), Ike Diogu of Arizona State (34) and Raymond Felton of North Carolina (24).

Major rule changes 
Beginning in 2003–04, the following rules changes were implemented:
 Officials could consult courtside monitor at the end of either half or any extra period to determine: (1) if a field-goal try beat the horn; (2) whether a shot-clock violation at the end of the first half beat the horn; or, (3) whether a shot-clock violation that would determine the outcome of a game beat the horn. The officials also could use a courtside monitor to correct a timer’s mistake or to determine if the game clock or shot clock expired at or near the end of a period.
 A team would have control when a player of that team had disposal of the ball for a throw-in.

Season outlook

Pre-season polls 
The top 25 from the AP and ESPN/USA Today Coaches Polls November 13, 2003.

Conference membership changes 

These schools joined new conferences for the 2003–04 season.

Regular season

Conference winners and tournaments

Statistical leaders

Postseason tournaments

NCAA tournament

Final Four – Alamodome, San Antonio, Texas

National Invitation tournament

Semifinals & finals

Award winners

Consensus All-American teams

Major player of the year awards 
 Wooden Award: Jameer Nelson, St. Joseph's
 Naismith Award: Jameer Nelson, St. Joseph's
 Associated Press Player of the Year: Jameer Nelson, St. Joseph's
 NABC Co-Player of the Year: Jameer Nelson, St. Joseph's & Emeka Okafor, Connecticut
 Oscar Robertson Trophy (USBWA): Jameer Nelson, St. Joseph's
 Adolph Rupp Trophy: Jameer Nelson, St. Joseph's
 CBS/Chevrolet Player of the Year: Jameer Nelson, St. Joseph's
 Sporting News Player of the Year: Jameer Nelson, St. Joseph's

Major freshman of the year awards 
 USBWA Freshman of the Year: Luol Deng, Duke
 Sporting News Freshman of the Year: Chris Paul, Wake Forest

Major coach of the year awards 
 Associated Press Coach of the Year: Phil Martelli, St. Joseph's
 Henry Iba Award (USBWA): Phil Martelli, St. Joseph's
 NABC Coach of the Year: Phil Martelli, St. Joseph's & Mike Montgomery, Stanford
 Naismith College Coach of the Year: Phil Martelli, St. Joseph's
 CBS/Chevrolet Coach of the Year: Phil Martelli, St. Joseph's
 Adolph Rupp Cup: Phil Martelli, St. Joseph's
 Sporting News Coach of the Year: Mike Montgomery, Stanford

Other major awards 
 Bob Cousy Award (Best point guard): Jameer Nelson, St. Joseph's
 Pete Newell Big Man Award (Best big man): Emeka Okafor, Connecticut
 NABC Defensive Player of the Year: Emeka Okafor, Connecticut
 Frances Pomeroy Naismith Award (Best player under 6'0): Jameer Nelson, St. Joseph's
 Lowe's Senior CLASS Award (top senior): Jameer Nelson, St. Joseph's
 Robert V. Geasey Trophy (Top player in Philadelphia Big 5): Jameer Nelson, St. Joseph's
 NIT/Haggerty Award (Top player in New York City metro area): Andre Barrett, Seton Hall, and Luis Flores, Manhattan
 Chip Hilton Player of the Year Award (Strong personal character): Emeka Okafor, UConn

Coaching changes 
A number of teams changed coaches throughout the season and after the season ended.

References